Bulgaria competed at the 2016 Summer Olympics in Rio de Janeiro, Brazil, from 5 to 21 August 2016. Bulgaria made their official debut at the 1896 Summer Olympics in Athens.  Bulgarian athletes had appeared in every edition of the Summer Olympics since 1924, except for three occasions: the 1948 Summer Olympics in London, and the 1932 and 1984 Summer Olympics in Los Angeles because of Bulgaria's actions in WW2, the worldwide Great Depression and the Soviet boycott, respectively.

The Bulgarian Olympic Committee fielded 51 athletes, 29 men and 22 women, across 14 sports at the Games. It was the nation's smallest delegation sent to the Olympics since 1956, due to the absence of the men's volleyball squad and the ban of 11 weightlifters over a widespread doping offense. Track and field and wrestling accounted for the largest number of athletes on the Bulgarian squad with 11 entries, nearly half of the nation's full roster size. There was only a single competitor each in road cycling, fencing, and modern pentathlon (the country's return to the sport at the Olympic Games after 16 years).

Sixteen Bulgarian athletes competed at London 2012, including four members of the rhythmic gymnastics squad (led by Mihaela Maevska-Velichkova, Albanian-born Elis Guri in Greco-Roman wrestling, pistol shooter and 2015 European Games silver medalist Antoaneta Boneva, and the country's fastest sprinter and two-time European champion Ivet Lalova-Collio in both the women's 100 and 200 metres. Heading to her fourth straight Olympics as the most experienced competitor, Lalova-Collio was selected by the committee to carry the Bulgarian flag at the opening ceremony, the second time by a female in the nation's Summer Olympic history.

Bulgaria returned home from Rio de Janeiro with only three medals (one silver and two bronze), marking a slight improvement from the nation's overall tally at the previous Games (not taking into account subsequent changes to the medal tallies for the 2012 Games due to doping violations). All of Bulgaria's medalists were women for the first time in history; a silver to high jumper Mirela Demireva,  and a bronze each to the rhythmic gymnastics troupe in the group all-around and freestyle wrestler Elitsa Yankova in the women's 48 kg.

Medalists

Competitors

| width=78% align=left valign=top |
The following is the list of number of competitors participating in the Games:

| width=22% align=left valign=top |

Athletics
 
Bulgarian athletes achieved qualifying standards in the following athletics events (up to a maximum of 3 athletes in each event):

Track & road events

Field events
Men

Women

Badminton

Bulgaria qualified three badminton players for each of the following events into the Olympic tournament. Linda Zechiri was selected among the top 34 individual shuttlers in the women's singles, while sisters Gabriela and Stefani Stoeva secured the women's doubles spot by virtue of their top 16 finish in the BWF World Rankings as of 5 May 2016.

Boxing
 
Bulgaria entered three boxers to compete in each of the following weight classes into the Olympic boxing tournament. Stanimira Petrova had claimed her Olympic spot with a semifinal victory at the 2016 European Qualification Tournament in Samsun, Turkey, while Daniel Asenov and Simeon Chamov secured additional places on the Bulgarian roster at the 2016 AIBA World Qualifying Tournament in Baku, Azerbaijan.

Canoeing

Sprint
Bulgaria qualified a single boat in the men's K-1 1000 m for the Games through the 2015 ICF Canoe Sprint World Championships. Meanwhile, one additional boat has been awarded to the Bulgarian squad in men's C-1 1000 m by virtue of a top two national finish at the 2016 European Qualification Regatta in Duisburg, Germany.

Qualification Legend: FA = Qualify to final (medal); FB = Qualify to final B (non-medal)

Cycling

Road
Bulgaria qualified one rider in the men's Olympic road race by virtue of his top 200 individual ranking in the 2015 UCI Europe Tour.

Fencing

Bulgaria entered one fencer into the Olympic competition. Pancho Paskov had claimed his Olympic spot in the men's sabre by finishing among the top four individuals at the European Zonal Qualifier in Prague, Czech Republic.

Gymnastics

Rhythmic 
Bulgaria qualified a squad of rhythmic gymnasts for the individual and group all-around by finishing in the top 15 (for individual) and top 10 (for group) at the 2015 World Championships in Stuttgart, Germany.

Judo

Bulgaria qualified two judokas for each of the following weight classes at the Games. Ivaylo Ivanov was ranked among the top 22 eligible judokas for men in the IJF World Ranking List of 30 May 2016, while Yanislav Gerchev at men's extra-lightweight (60 kg) earned a continental quota spot from the European region as Bulgaria's top-ranked judoka outside of direct qualifying position.

Modern pentathlon

Bulgaria received an invitation from UIPM to send Dimitar Krastanov in the men's modern pentathlon to the Olympics, as one of the next highest-ranked eligible individuals, not yet qualified, at the 2015 European Championships, signifying the nation's return to the sport for the first time since 2000.

Rowing

Bulgaria qualified one boat in the men's double sculls for the Olympics at the 2015 FISA World Championships in Lac d'Aiguebelette, France.

Qualification Legend: FA=Final A (medal); FB=Final B (non-medal); FC=Final C (non-medal); FD=Final D (non-medal); FE=Final E (non-medal); FF=Final F (non-medal); SA/B=Semifinals A/B; SC/D=Semifinals C/D; SE/F=Semifinals E/F; QF=Quarterfinals; R=Repechage

Shooting
 
Bulgarian shooters achieved quota places for the following events by virtue of their best finishes at the 2014 and 2015 ISSF World Championships, the 2015 ISSF World Cup series, and European Championships or Games, as long as they obtained a minimum qualifying score (MQS) by 31 March 2016.

Qualification Legend: Q = Qualify for the next round; q = Qualify for the bronze medal (shotgun)

Swimming
 
Bulgarian swimmers achieved qualifying standards in the following events (up to a maximum of 2 swimmers in each event at the Olympic Qualifying Time (OQT), and potentially 1 at the Olympic Selection Time (OST)):

Tennis

Bulgaria entered two tennis players into the Olympic tournament. London 2012 Olympian Grigor Dimitrov (world no. 36) qualified directly for the men's singles as one of the top 56 eligible players based on the ATP World Rankings, while Tsvetana Pironkova (world no. 71) had claimed one of six ITF Olympic women's singles places, as Bulgaria's top-ranked tennis player outside of direct qualifying position in the WTA World Rankings as of 6 June 2016.

Wrestling

Bulgaria qualified a total of eleven wrestlers for each the following weight classes into the Olympic competition. Three Olympic berths were awarded to Bulgarian wrestlers, who finished among the top six at the 2015 World Championships, while five more had booked Olympic spots with their semifinal triumphs at the 2016 European Qualification Tournament.

Three further wrestlers had claimed the remaining Olympic slots to round out the Bulgarian roster at the initial meet of the World Qualification Tournament in Ulaanbaatar.

On 11 May 2016, United World Wrestling awarded an additional Olympic license to Bulgaria in men's freestyle 125 kg, as a response to the doping violations for both the Belarusian and Ukrainian wrestler at the European Qualification Tournament.

Men's freestyle

Men's Greco-Roman

Women's freestyle

See also
Bulgaria at the 2016 Summer Paralympics

References

External links 

 

Olympics
2016
Nations at the 2016 Summer Olympics